Simon Hocquaux (born 21 November 1995) is a French figure skater. He has competed at three World Junior Championships, reaching the free skate in 2013 and 2014. He is the 2016 French national bronze medalist.

Programs

Competitive highlights 
GP: Grand Prix; CS: Challenger Series; JGP: Junior Grand Prix

Detailed results
Small medals for short and free programs awarded only at ISU Championships.

References

External links 

 

1995 births
French male single skaters
Living people
Sportspeople from Évreux
Competitors at the 2017 Winter Universiade
21st-century French people